Lieutenant General Kenneth Pickersgill is a former South African Army officer, who served as Chief of Staff Logistics from 1 July 1989 to 1991.He served as Quartermaster General (19821989).

Awards and decorations

References

South African generals
Living people
Year of birth missing (living people)